Suspicion Breeds Confidence is a German electronic music project of Tobias Schmitt. Tomislav Bucalic and Aidan Mark appear frequently on the recordings and join the live performances. They derive their name from one of the totalitarian slogans from Terry Gilliam's film Brazil.

Discography

Albums
1999: Déjà Vu Of A Duck
1999: Eight Reasons For Being Pathetic
2001: Nyugodt
2001: Phager Incallidus (Exhibitionismus XI)
2008: The Fauna And Flora Of The Vatican City

Singles
2004: Schmalz

References

External links
 Official homepage
 Suspicion Breeds Confidence's Myspace profile
 Discography at Discogs.com

German musical groups